Andrew Davidson may refer to:

 Andrew Davidson (Army surgeon) (1819–1901), American soldier in the American Civil War
 Andrew B. Davidson (1831–1902), Scottish professor of Hebrew and Oriental languages
 Andrew Davidson (physician) (1836–1918), Scottish medical missionary and tropical medicine educator
 Andrew Davidson (soldier) (1840–1902), Scottish soldier in the American Civil War
 Andrew Davidson (footballer) (1878–1949), Scottish footballer with Middlesbrough, Bury, Grimsby Town and Southampton
 Andrew Davidson (knight) (1892–1962), captain, footballer, knight, professor, public health official and royal physician
 Andrew Davidson (educationalist) (1894–1982), New Zealand teacher and educationalist
 Andrew Hope Davidson (1895–1967), professor of midwifery
 Andrew Nevile Davidson (1899–1976), Church of Scotland minister
 Andrew Davidson, 2nd Viscount Davidson (1928–2012), British peer and Conservative politician
 Andrew Davidson (illustrator) (born 1958), British illustrator
 Andrew Davidson (author) (born 1969), Canadian writer
 Andrew Davidson (Big Brother), contestant on the first series of Big Brother UK in 2000
 Andrew Davidson (rugby union) (born 1996), Scottish rugby player

See also
Andy Davidson (disambiguation)
Andrew Davison (1886–1963), Canadian politician
Andrew Davison (American football) (1979–2017), American football player
Andrew Davison, justice of the Indiana Supreme Court